This list includes all elected officials who must take an oath of office before the Royal Court of Jersey.

Island-wide elections

Senators
The role of Senator was an elected politician with an elected mandate covering the whole of the Island of Jersey. This position allowed the electorate to vote from anywhere in the island, regardless of Parish or Vingtaigne district. This role was discontinued for the 2022 election leaving only Constables of the respective Parishes and Deputies of newly adjusted constituencies as the island's political representation of the States Assembly.

The Senators, are as follows;

Senator Sir Philip Bailhache - Minister for External Relations 
Senator Andrew Kenneth Francis Green - Minister for Health and Social Services
Senator Lyndon John Farnham - Minister for Economic Development
Senator Sarah Ferguson
Senator Ian Gorst – Chief Minister
Senator Alan Maclean - Treasury and Resources Minister 
Senator Philip Ozouf 
Senator Paul Routier

Municipality of St Helier

Parish-wide elections 
Connétable of St Helier Simon Crowcroft
Procureur du Bien Public - Peter Pearce
Procureur du Bien Public - John Baker

Roads Committee
Principal of the Roads Committee Ted Vibert
Principal of the Roads Committee Jason Lagadu 
 
Principal of the Roads Committee Bernard Manning
Principal of the Roads Committee Kevin Proctor
Principal of the Roads Committee (vacant)
Principal of the Roads Committee The Very Reverend Mike Keirle

Honorary Police 
Chef de Police Daniel Scaife  
Centenier Paul Davies
Centenier David Curtis
Centenier Louise Happer
Centenier Shirley Madden
Centenier Peter Garrett
Centenier Marta Fontes
Centenier Paul Huelin
Centenier Lesley Stirk
Centenier Jane Pearce

Vingtaine de la Ville
Vingtenier Isaura De Castro
Vingtenier Ben Wheaton
Constable's Officer Elisabete Clayden
Constable's Officer Miroslav Yolov
Constable's Officer Diane Pontes
Constable's Officer Patricia Esteves
Constable's Officer Sangeeta Shukla
Constable's Officer Jessica Chays
Deputy Russell Labey
Deputy Judy Martin
Deputy Scott Wickenden
Roads Inspector 
Roads Inspector Geraint Jennings

Vingtaine du Mont Cochon
Vingtenier Cindy Skinner
Constable's Officer John Brawley
Constable's Officer Heather Fowler
Constable's Officer Rachel Nugent
Constable's Officer Paulo Correia
Deputy Jackie Hilton (Also serves Mont a L'Abbe and Rouge Boullion)
Deputy Andrew Lewis (Also serves Mont a L'Abbe and Rouge Boullion)
Deputy Richard Rondel (Also serves Mont a L'Abbe and Rouge Boullion)
Deputy Mike Higgins (Also serves Mont a L'Abbe and Rouge Boullion)
Roads Inspector Malcolm Motee
Roads Inspector Christopher Whitworth

Vingtaine du Mont à l'Abbé
Vingtenier Merces Pereira
Constable's Officer Aneta Popiolek
Constable's Officer Anthony Bougeard
Roads Inspector Edward Lindsey
Roads Inspector José Veloso

Vingtaine du Rouge Bouillon
Vingtenier Elizabeth Deahl
Constable's Officer Thomas Nerac
Constable's Officer Rosemary Le Mottee
Constable's Officer Rachel Williams
Roads Inspector Martyn Gallery

Vingtaine de Bas du Mont au Prêtre
Vingtenier Steve Gaston
Constable's Officer Cristina Cercel
Constable's Officer Elvis Vieira
Constable's Officer Sinead Hanrahan
Constable's Officer Aneta Jerziorska-Entwistle
Deputy Carina Alves (also serves Haut du Mont au Prêtre)
Deputy Robert Ward (also serves Haut du Mont au Prêtre)
Deputy Geoff Southern (also serves Haut du Mont au Prêtre)
Roads Inspector Rozelle Le Moignan
Roads Inspector

Vingtaine de Haut du Mont au Prêtre
Vingtenier Liana Le Rossignol
Constable's Officer Lauren Thomson
Roads Inspector Sarah Richardson
Roads Inspector Stéphane Rault

Municipality of St Saviour

Parish-wide elections
Constable Sadie Anthea Rennard, Assermenté October 2014
Procureur du Bien Public Bryan William Le Lievre, 22 October 2004
Procureur du Bien Public Peter de Carteret Mourant, 14 October 2005
Centenier Colin Foley, Assermenté 11 April 2014
Centenier Philip Douglas McDonald, Assermenté 21 June 2013
Centenier Elvio Vieira, Assermenté 13 June 2014
Centenier Bernard Peter Connor BEM, Assermenté 1 August 2014
Centenier Mrs Isabella Ingrid Lewis, Assermenté 12 December 2014
Centenier Vacant, Assermenté 
Centenier Vacant, Assermenté
Principal of the Roads Committee Geoffrey John Morris
Principal of the Roads Committee Ian Blandin
Principal of the Roads Committee Andrew Mollet Jelley

Vigntaine du Maufant and Sous La Hougue
Deputy Terence McDonald St Saviour #3
Vingtenier Daniel Avrill, Assermenté 8 March 2013
Vingtenier Paul Harvey, Assermenté 27 September 2013
Constable's Officer Stephen Phillips, Assermenté 28 November 2014
Constable's Officer Marcus Bernard Faith Hawgood, Assermenté 7 December 2012
Roads Inspector Collette Perchard
Roads Inspector Robin Perchard
Roads Inspector Elizabeth Pryke

Vingtaine du Pigneaux and Grande Longueville
Deputy Jeremy Maçon (also represent Vingtaine du Petite Longueville)
Deputy Peter McLinton (also represent Vingtaine du Petite Longueville)
Vingtenier John Richards, Assermenté 31 August 2012
Constable's Officer Michael Byrne, Assermenté 2 May 2014
Constable's Officer Kirsty Phillips, Assermenté 11 April 2014
Roads Inspector Katrina Wyatt
Roads Inspector Adrian Willis
Roads Inspector Michel Aime Le Bihan

Vingtaine du Petite Longueville
Vingtenier Liam Jennings, Assermenté 27 September 2013
Constable's Officer Octavio Silva, Assermenté 11 April 2014
Constable's Officer 
Constable's Officer 
Constable's Officer 
Roads Inspector Andrew Le Gallais
Roads Inspector Stephen Wyatt
Roads Inspector Francis Hedley Le Quesne

Vingtaine du Sous L'Eglise
Deputy Louise Doublet
Deputy Kevin Lewis
Vingtenier Nigel John Tanner, Assermenté 19 December 2014
Constable's Officer Gabriela Feraud, Assermenté 10 January 2014
Constable's Officer Aldona Skrzypczuk, Assermenté 13 December 2013
Constable's Officer 
Roads Inspector Geoffrey Esnouf
Roads Inspector Robert Hamon
Roads Inspector

Other parishes - Deputies 
Note: A reliable source has been found for the full civil administration of the other ten parishes and they will be added in due course.
Deputy Graham Truscott St Brelade #2
Deputy Montfort Tadier St Brelade #2
Deputy Murray Norton St Brelade #1
Deputy John Le Fondré St Lawrence
Deputy Edward James Noel St Lawrence - Minister for Infrastructure 
Deputy Susan Jane Pinel St Clement - Minister for Social Security
Deputy Simon Bree St Clement
Deputy Kristina Moore St Peter - Minister for Home Affairs
Deputy Richard Renouf St Ouen
Deputy Tracey Vallois St John
Deputy Anne Pryke Trinity - Minister for Housing
Deputy Stephen Luce St Martin - Minister for Planning and Environment
Deputy Carolyn Labey Grouville
Deputy David Johnson St Mary

Other parishes Constables
Connétable of St Ouen Richard Alan Buchanan
Connétable of St Mary Juliette Gallichan 
Connétable of St Peter John Martin Refault 
Connétable of St Clement Leonard Norman 
Connétable of Trinity Philip Le Sueur 
Connétable of St Lawrence Deidre Mezbourian - Assistant Minister for Home Affairs
Connétable of Grouville John Le Maistre (soon to retire) 
Connétable of St Brelade Stephen William Pallett 
Connétable of St Martin Michel Philip Sydney Le Troquer 
Connétable of St John Christopher Taylor

References

External links
States Assembly Website list of members
Parish of St Helier Civil Administration list of elected officials
Parish of St Saviour Civil Administration list of elected officials

Politicians
Politicians
Jersey
Jersey